Gistemar, Ghislemar, or Gilmer (died in the 680s) was briefly the mayor of the palace in Neustria and Burgundy after deposing his father Waratton in 682.  He reversed the peace with Austrasia of his father and warred with Pepin of Heristal, overcoming him in Namur.  He reigned thereafter briefly and Waratton soon fought himself back into his office. However Gistemar did not give it up easily and continued to contend for the title until his death, before his father, in 683, 684, or 686.

His mother was Ansflede.

680s deaths
Mayors of the Palace
Year of birth unknown